Pterophorus lindneri is a moth of the family Pterophoridae. It is known from Ethiopia.

The species is shining white, without any dark scales.

References

Endemic fauna of Ethiopia
lindneri
Insects of Ethiopia
Moths of Africa
Moths described in 1963
Taxa named by Hans Georg Amsel